Raviteja Residential High School is located in Nagarkurnool, Mahabubnagar District, Andhra Pradesh, India.

Established in 1990, it was one of the first private high schools in Nagarkurnool. It is located opposite to Housing board colony in a peaceful 2ha area, on Nagarkurnool to Hyderabad state road.

It touts innovative teaching methods, discipline and extra curricular activities.

External links

High schools and secondary schools in Andhra Pradesh
1990 establishments in Andhra Pradesh
Educational institutions established in 1990